Jimmy Ndayizeye (born 23 December 1976) is a Burundian football manager and former player who last managed the Burundi national team.

Club career
Ndayizeye became his career at Burundian club Prince Louis, before signing for Atlético Olympic in 2001, before returning to Prince Louis in 2002. In 2003, Ndayizeye signed for Rwandan club Kiyovu Sports, playing for the club for four seasons, before retiring in 2006.

International career
Ndayizeye made ten caps for the Burundi national team, making his debut on 13 October 2002 in a 2–0 loss against South Africa.

Managerial career
In 2008, Ndayizeye was appointed manager of Académie Tchité. Ndayizeye stayed with the club for six years, winning the 2013 Burundian Cup with Académie Tchité. In August 2016, Rwandan club Espoir hired Ndayizeye. On 22 March 2018, Ndayizeye was sacked as manager of Espoir.

In 2020, after a spell with Burundian club Le Messager, Ndayizeye was appointed manager of Burundi.

References

1976 births
Living people
Burundian footballers
Association football defenders
Burundi international footballers
Prince Louis FC players
Atlético Olympic FC players
S.C. Kiyovu Sports players
Burundian football managers
Burundi national football team managers
Burundian expatriate footballers
Burundian expatriate sportspeople in Rwanda
Expatriate footballers in Rwanda